The OneAmerica 500 Festival Mini-Marathon, which takes place in Indianapolis, Indiana, is the largest half marathon in the United States, and the seventh-largest running event in America.  As of the 37th running in 2013, it had sold out the entire running field of 35,000 for twelve consecutive years.

Commonly known as "The Mini," it attracts runners and spectators from all over the United States and the entire world. In 2011, participants came from all fifty states and nine countries. The race includes a men's and women's running division, as well as men's and women's wheelchair entries. The Delta Dental 500 Festival 5K, a shorter version of the Mini utilizing the same start and finish lines, runs the same day.

The Mini-Marathon began in 1977 and became an official 500 Festival event in 1979. The 500 Festival, a not-for-profit volunteer organization, was created in 1957 to organize civic events celebrating the Indianapolis 500-Mile Race. Over the past 55 years, the 500 Festival has grown to become one of the largest festivals in the nation. The Mini-Marathon is one of the first events of the month of May at Indy.

The  course currently starts in downtown Indianapolis, includes city streets then heads west toward Speedway. It features a full loop around the Indianapolis Motor Speedway, then returns to finish in the downtown area. From 1977 to 1992, the race was held the Friday before the Indianapolis 500 (part of Memorial Day weekend). Starting in 1993, the race was moved to early May, the Saturday three weeks before the race except a few exceptions.

The men's record for the Mini is 1:01:52 set by Nelson Oyugi in 2014. The women's record was set in 2010 by Janet Cherobon with a time of 1:10:59.

From 1994 to 2004 it was known as the Indianapolis Life 500 Festival Mini-Marathon.

In 2020, the race was cancelled for the first time in its history, due to the coronavirus pandemic. Entrants from this year's were given invitations to the 2021 race.

Selected history

2008
The race resulted in the closest finish ever in the history of the event: a tie. Two Kenyan runners, Lamech Mokono and Valentine Orare, were declared co-winners, extending the streak of Kenyan victories to 13. In the women's race, Janet Cherobon successfully defended her title. Tony Íñiguez became a three-time champ in the wheelchair division.

2011
The 2011 OneAmerica 500 Festival Mini-Marathon took place Saturday May 7, 2011.  A pair of newcomers brought home the men's and women's titles in the 2011 OneAmerica 500 Festival Mini-Marathon in Indianapolis. Moroccan Ridouane Harroufi took the men's race, winning in 1:02.45, while Everlyne Lagat of Kenya captured the women's race with a time of 1:11:29, snapping the four-year win streak of fellow Kenyan Janet Cherobon-Bawcom, who took second. Adam Bleakney of Champaign, Ill., took advantage of the ideal conditions to win the wheelchair race with a blistering time of 49.18. The 2006 winner of the same race, Bleakney, a member of the 2008 U.S. Paralympics teams, was competing in Indianapolis for the first time since his previous win.

Past winners

See also
 List of half marathon races
 List of attractions and events in Indianapolis

References

External links

"Timeline of the Indianapolis Mini Marathon" at Indianapolis Star, February 9, 2007

Half marathons in the United States
Festivals in Indianapolis
Sports competitions in Indianapolis
Recurring sporting events established in 1977
Annual sporting events in the United States
1977 establishments in Indiana
Track and field in Indiana